The Sovereign Princess 24 is an American trailerable sailboat that was designed by Arthur Edmunds as a cruiser and first built in 1981.

Like the Sovereign 23 family of boats and the Sovereign 7.0, the Sovereign Princess 24 is a development of Edmunds' S2 7.0 design, using the same hull molds, with a new deck design.

Production
The design was built by Sovereign Yachts in Port Richey, Florida, United States, starting in 1981, but it is now out of production.

Design
The Sovereign Princess 24 is a recreational keelboat, built predominantly of fiberglass, with wood trim. It has a masthead sloop rig with a  bowsprit, a raked stem, a plumb transom, a transom-hung rudder controlled by a tiller or optional wheel and a fixed fin shoal draft keel or optional deeper keel. It displaces  and carries  of ballast.

The boat is normally fitted with a small outboard motor for docking and maneuvering.

The design has sleeping accommodation for four people, with a double "V"-berth in the bow cabin and two straight settee berths in the main cabin. The galley is located on the starboard side of the companionway ladder. The galley is equipped with a two-burner stove, icebox and a sink. The head is located on the port side of the companionway.

For sailing the design is equipped with a jib or one of a series of larger genoas.

See also
List of sailing boat types

References

External links
Photo of a Sovereign Princess 24

Keelboats
1980s sailboat type designs
Sailing yachts 
Trailer sailers
Sailboat type designs by Arthur Edmunds
Sailboat types built by Sovereign Yachts